Beltline is a region of central Calgary, Alberta, Canada. The area is located immediately to the south of Calgary's downtown (south of 9th Avenue and the Canadian Pacific Railway tracks), and is sometimes considered part of downtown. The neighbourhood is bounded on the south by 17th Avenue, on the west by 14th Street West and on the east by the Elbow River. Beltline is one of Calgary's most densely populated neighbourhoods as well as the most urban, featuring many apartments, condominiums and offices. It has the reputation of being one of Calgary's primary areas for eclectic night-life, restaurants and urban culture.

The first established district in the neighbourhood was Connaught in 1905, followed by Victoria Park in 1914. When the region and its redevelopment plan were formally established in 2003, it amalgamated the inner city neighbourhoods of Victoria Park and Connaught. The community is named for an early 20th-century streetcar route. As of April 2018, there were 24,887 people residing in Beltline.

The Calgary Fire Department serves Beltline from Fire Station No. 2 at 1010 10 Avenue S.W.

Districts
The City of Calgary recognizes four smaller districts in Beltline community: West Connaught, Connaught Centre, Victoria Park and East Victoria Park. They are areas of equal north-south orientation and divided by 8 Street SW, 4 Street SW, Macleod Trail (1 Street SE) and the Elbow River.

Beltline contains a number of less formal city districts within its boundaries. These include Midtown, the Design District, Victoria Park Business Revitalization Zone (Victoria), the 4th Street BRZ (located mostly within Mission), the Uptown 17th BRZ, the Warehouse District, and a portion of the Rivers District.

17th Avenue
17th Avenue, which is on the southern extremity of Beltline, is a mixed-use area with a dense concentration of bars, restaurants, nightclubs, and shops. Behind this commercial development are residential areas. The street also "dead-ends" at the Stampede Grounds on its east side, and is thus central to the party-like atmosphere that overtakes the city during the Calgary Stampede festival. 17th Avenue was nicknamed the "Red Mile" in 2004 during the playoff run of Calgary's NHL team, the Calgary Flames. During this time, it was not uncommon to see over 100,000 fans crowding the street and its bars and pubs on game nights.

Connaught
Connaught was established in 1905, and comprises the western part of Beltline, west of 4th Street W. Residents in this community had a median household income of $38,960 in 2000, and 26.1% of residents living in the neighbourhood were low-income.

Victoria Park

Victoria Park comprises the eastern part of Beltline, is bisected by Macleod Trail, and contains the Warehouse district. It was named after Queen Victoria, who is celebrated in a monument to the Second Boer War located in Central Memorial Park. Victoria Park is adjacent to the Stampede Grounds and the Scotiabank Saddledome arena. Residents in this community had a median household income of $28,843 in 2000, and there were 34.2% low income residents living in the neighbourhood.

Demographics 
This made Beltline the fastest growing neighbourhood in 2018. Beltline is one of the densest populated areas in the city, however due to significant undeveloped land in its Victoria Park region, the overall density figure tends to underrepresent the actual density of the developed regions.

Redevelopment

Beltline is a neighbourhood in transition. The district, along with the Rivers District and the Downtown East Village, are presently in the midst of an ambitious urban planning and rejuvenation venture planned by the city's municipal government to increase the residential density of central Calgary. On May 15, 2006 the Calgary City Council approved the Beltline Area Redevelopment Plan. The plan details land use policies and implementation recommendations which are designed to be implemented concurrently with the broader Land Use Bylaw redesign, to take effect in 2008. It aims to accommodate up to 40,000 residents in the neighbourhood by 2035.

A report on the Beltline ARP was presented to the Calgary Planning Commission on September 20, 2007. A public open house and information session occurred in late October 2007, with a Public Council Hearing occurring on November 12, 2007.

The area is intended to operate as a mixed-use region and is to include a mix of commercial services and high density condominium and apartment towers. Many of these residential structures are already under construction, and even more are in the proposal stages. Currently there are over 37 major residential towers in some stage of development in the community.

Victoria Park is a region of focused municipal redevelopment. The City of Calgary has declared it a Business Revitalization Zone (BRZ) and is encouraging a progressive redevelopment of the much-maligned community. The 42 and 34-story residential Arriva project, the tallest condominium development west of Toronto; the Sasso and Vetro development; the Colours project; and the multi-use Hotel Arts Centre, suggest a vibrant and renewed future for Victoria Park, with a great deal of investment and interest.
The district is also one of the city's most historic. Not only does it include two of the city's oldest neighbourhoods, but it also encompasses the Stampede Grounds, the site of Calgary's annual Calgary Stampede which sees over 1.25 million visitors per year.

In 2007, Victoria Park was one of the first communities to get its own Wi-Fi Network. WestNet Wireless deployed the high speed network, which offers fiber optic speeds over Wi-Fi.

In 2020, city council approved construction the Calgary Green Line, which will have two subway style stations in the Beltine: Centre Street South Station and 4 Street SE Station. The Green Line will be entirely underground through the Beltline in a tunnel under 11 Avenue S. Construction of the Beltline segment of the line will begin in 2022.

Education

Two public schools are located in Beltline, the Connaught Community School and the Victoria Community School. Western Canada High School is located along the 17th Avenue boundary of the community, and serves the area.  One block outside Beltline is St. Mary's High School which serves most of the Roman Catholic high school students in the area

Social issues

There is a significant mix of economic groups in the community. With new revitalization, a number of middle and upper income groups are establishing themselves in the area due to the close proximity to downtown.
However, low income residents still make up a large proportion of the population (28.3% in 2001). The Mustard Seed Calgary is located in Beltline at 102 11 Ave SE. There are also many poorly maintained and dilapidated buildings with low rents. A large portion of Victoria Park, in particular, is in poor condition due to the city's decision to restrict development on lands needed for Calgary Stampede expansion Owners of this land were generally not interested in improving buildings they knew would be removed soon. As a result, a number of seemingly abandoned buildings were occupied illegally by squatters. As the city has finalized land purchases and made final decisions on land use, this has decreased dramatically.

The median household income in 2005 was $43,087 in Beltline. (compared with $67,283 Calgary average).  Immigrants made up 31.3% of the residents in 2006, this compares against an immigrant population of 24.8% for Calgary overall. The majority of the buildings (95.8%) are apartments, and 70.9% of the dwellings were used for renting in 2006.

References

External links
 Calgary Beltline Communities - Mainly pictures of the beltline area.
 Beltline Victoria and Connaught Info Site
 Victoria Park Info Site

Neighbourhoods in Calgary
Shopping districts and streets in Canada